Mick McCarthy (22 December 1911 – 21 May 1973) was an Ireland international footballer who played as a goalkeeper. He spent the majority of his career playing in the League of Ireland for Shamrock Rovers, helping the club win three league titles and three FAI Cups.

Playing career

Club career
McCarthy originally came from Blackrock, Cork and as a youth he played hurling as well as association football. He played for Cork Bohemians and Fordsons before signing for Shamrock Rovers on 6 November 1931. A number of Scottish clubs, as well as Birmingham City, made enquiries about signing him before he opted to join Rovers. In 1931–32 he was part of Rovers team that won the treble, winning the League of Ireland, the FAI Cup and the League of Ireland Shield. Other members of the team included Jimmy Daly, John Joe Flood, Paddy Moore, Owen Kinsella, David Byrne, John Burke and William Glen. After three years at Rovers, McCarthy joined Sheffield United. He was signed by United following an impressive performance in a 2–2 draw between Rovers and United in the Duggan Cup. He made his debut against Bradford City on 27 August 1934 in a 5–2 league win, making nine appearances in total and keeping two clean sheets. However a serious thigh injury forced him to return to Ireland. Despite been told he would never play again, McCarthy made a comeback and after a short spell at Brideville he rejoined  Shamrock Rovers in 1936–37.

International career

Ireland
On 8 May 1932 McCarthy made his one and only appearance for Ireland in a 2–0 away win against the Netherlands at the Olympic Stadium.

League of Ireland XI
On 14 April 1941 McCarthy represented the League of Ireland XI against the Irish League XI at Windsor Park.

Death
McCarthy died in his home in Clonskeagh in May 1973.

Honours
Shamrock Rovers
League of Ireland
 1931–32, 1937–38, 1938–39: 3
FAI Cup
 1931–32, 1932–33, 1939–40: 3
League of Ireland Shield
  1931–32, 1932–33, 1937–38: 3
Leinster Senior Cup
 1932–33, 1937–38: 3

References

1911 births
1973 deaths
Association footballers from Cork (city)
Republic of Ireland association footballers
Republic of Ireland international footballers
League of Ireland players
League of Ireland XI players
Fordsons F.C. players
Shamrock Rovers F.C. players
Sheffield United F.C. players
English Football League players
Association football goalkeepers